Thomas Matthew Sherry (5 October 1881 – 3 August 1971) was an Australian rules footballer who played with Geelong in the Victorian Football League (VFL).

Career
Sherry, a recruit from Barwon, played for Geelong in the 1907 VFL season. He came into the side in round five and played in the remainder of Geelong's games that season, a total of 13 appearances. His tally of 18 goals in 1907 was enough to win Geelong's leading goalkicker award.

In 1908, Sherry applied for a clearance to the Melbourne Football Club, but it was refused. He instead made his way to Victorian Football Association club Prahran.

References

External links

1881 births
Australian rules footballers from Victoria (Australia)
Geelong Football Club players
Barwon Football Club players
Prahran Football Club players
1971 deaths